The Field Elm cultivar Ulmus minor 'Viminalis Gracilis' [:'slender'] is a form of U. minor 'Viminalis'. Cultivars listed as Ulmus gracilis Hort. by Kirchner (1864), and as U. scabra viminalis gracilis Hort. by Dieck (1885),<ref>Dieck, Zoschen, Germany, (1885) 'Haupt-catalog der Obst- und gehölzbaumschulen des ritterguts Zöschen bei Merseburg, p. 82</ref> were considered by Green to be forms of Melville's U. × viminalis. A 1929 herbarium specimen held at the Hortus Botanicus Leiden is labelled U. campestris var. viminalis f. gracilis, implying a cultivar that differed from the 'type' tree.

Description
The epithet 'gracilis' usually refers to the slender habit of a cultivar. Dippel (1892), who treated the 'Viminalis' group as a form of U. montana (sometimes used for hybrids in his day), described viminalis f. gracilis as a small to medium-sized tree, with even finer, more hanging branches than type-'Viminalis', and smaller, narrower, almost slit-edged leaves. The Leiden herbarium specimen shows a leaf apparently distinct from that of the type, with narrower, almost hair-like, scarcely double teeth (see 'External links' below).

Pests and diseases
Trees of the U. minor 'Viminalis' group are very susceptible to Dutch elm disease. 

Cultivation
No specimens are known to survive. 

References

External links
 Sheet labelled U. campestris var. viminalis f. gracilis (Leiden specimen) 
 Sheet labelled U. viminalis gracilis (Leiden specimen)
 Sheet labelled U. montana Sm. var. viminalis Koch f. gracilis (1901) 
  Sheet labelled U. montana Sm. var. viminalis f. gracilis = U. procera f. viminalis'' [ = U. minor 'Viminalis ]

Field elm cultivar
Ulmus articles missing images
Ulmus